Fillan Church is a parish church of the Church of Norway in Hitra municipality in Trøndelag county, Norway. It is located in the village of Fillan on the east coast of the island of Hitra. It is one of the churches for the Hitra og Fillan parish which is part of the Orkdal prosti (deanery) in the Diocese of Nidaros. The red, wooden church was built in a cruciform design in 1789 using plans drawn up by the architect Fredrich Bertelsen Ødegaard. The church seats about 400 people.

History

The earliest existing historical records of the church date back to the year 1432, but the church was built before that time. The first church for Fillan was located at Ulvan on the island of Ulvøya and it was likely built during the 1200s, before the Black Death in Norway. Records show that the wind vane blew down and had to be repaired in the 1640s, and in 1659 lightning struck the tower which also had to be repaired.

In 1686, the old church was torn down and replaced with a new building on the same site. The church was described by the parish priest, Bang, in 1780 where he wrote that the church was old, low, narrow, and dark, and that the indoor air during the sermons was unbearable because of the many unhealthy fumes from the clothing worn by the local fishermen. In 1789, the old church was torn down and a new cruciform church was built on the same site. The new church was consecrated on 16 September 1789, which makes it the oldest existing church on the island of Hitra.

See also
List of churches in Nidaros

References

Hitra
Churches in Trøndelag
Cruciform churches in Norway
Wooden churches in Norway
18th-century Church of Norway church buildings
Churches completed in 1789
13th-century establishments in Norway